It is alleged that as a result of benefits extended to Michael Lowry by Denis O'Brien that Esat Digifone was given an unfair advantage in the procurement of a mobile phone operator's licence.

The Moriarty Tribunal found evidence of collusion between Lowry and O'Brien:  "There are three significant findings which are largely beyond dispute. They are:

 Denis O’Brien gave substantial sums of money to Fine Gael in order to make friends with people in the party.

This happened at a time when Fine Gael was in government and O’Brien was seeking a government decision in his favour.

 Michael Lowry sought to be involved, to a greater or lesser degree, in the licensing process, seeking information about it on a number of occasions
 Denis O’Brien, or persons close to him, subsequently sought to give large amounts of money to Michael Lowry."

References

Political scandals in the Republic of Ireland
Michael Lowry